Achaearyopa is a monotypic genus of Filipino comb-footed spiders containing the single species, Achaearyopa pnaca. It was first described by A. T. Barrion & J. A. Litsinger in 1995, and is found in the Philippines.

See also
 List of Theridiidae species

References

Monotypic Araneomorphae genera
Spiders of Asia
Theridiidae